Jacques Bellenger (25 December 1927 – 24 October 2020) was a French cyclist. He competed in the sprint event at the 1948 Summer Olympics.

References

1927 births
2020 deaths
French male cyclists
Olympic cyclists of France
Cyclists at the 1948 Summer Olympics
Sportspeople from Amiens
Cyclists from Hauts-de-France